The Merapoh railway station is a Malaysian train station of the KTM East Coast Line located and named after the town of Merapoh, Lipis District, Pahang.

Train services
 Ekspres Rakyat Timuran 26/27 Tumpat–JB Sentral
 Shuttle Timur 50/53/58/59 Gua Musang–Kuala Lipis

KTM East Coast Line stations
Lipis District
Railway stations in Pahang